Alfredo Santoro (born 6 November 1906, date of death unknown) was an Argentine boxer who competed in the 1924 Summer Olympics. In 1924 he was eliminated in the second round of the welterweight class after losing his fight to Théodore Stauffer.

References

External links
profile

1906 births
Year of death missing
Welterweight boxers
Olympic boxers of Argentina
Boxers at the 1924 Summer Olympics
Argentine male boxers